A Successful Failure is a 1934 American film directed by Arthur Lubin. It was Lubin's first film as director.

There is no connection between the fictional radio personality "Uncle Dudley" in this film, and the 1935 comedy film Your Uncle Dudley, with Edward Everett Horton.

Plot
Ellery Cushing (William Collier Sr.) has trouble at home, and at work. When he's fired from the newspaper where he's worked for fifteen years, his friend Phil (Russell Hopton) quits too, outraged.

Together, they work from their "office", on a park bench, until Phil can get Ellery a try-out, on a radio spot, as "Uncle Dudley". The character is a big hit, with his folksy witticisms.

Meanwhile, at home, Ma, Mrs. Cushing (Lucile Gleason), has her hands full with their daughter, Ruth (Gloria Shea), who has spurned Phil's attentions for an aging Lothario, Jerry (Jameson Thomas). While their oldest son, Robert (William Janney), after turning down a job, has got mixed up with some "Red" rabble-rousers, in the park.

Only their youngest son, Tommy (George P. Breakston), manages to stay out of trouble, doing his homework. Tommy thinks their Dad is alright, even better than "that guy on the radio", who they don't know is their father.

It's only after "Uncle Dudley" gets a concussion, after being hit with a brick, quelling a riot of "Reds", in the park that his family begin to value his worth, and, Phil's, if they all live to appreciate it.

Cast 
William Collier Sr. as Ellery Cushing aka Uncle Dudley
Lucile Gleason as Mrs. Cushing
Russell Hopton as Phil Stardon
George P. Breakston as Tommy Cushing
William Janney as Robert Cushing
Gloria Shea as Ruth Cushing
Clarence Wilson as H. T. Flintly, News Record Editor
Jameson Thomas as Jerry Franklin, Ruth's Beau
Richard Tucker as J. W. Blair, Atlas Broadcasting
David Hanna as The savage, Atlas Broadcasting

Production
This film is based on the short story,"Your Uncle William" by Michael Kane, published in The Saturday Evening Post.

William Collier signed in June 1934. The film marked Lucile Gleason's return to movies after a break. Arthur Lubin became attached to direct in July.

In August 1934 the film was officially put on Monogram's slate.

It was the first film directed by Arthur Lubin who had been an actor and had directed theatre. He says it was shot in five days.

Reception
Lubin said "when it was reviewed in The Hollywood Reporter the headline was 'A Successful Failure: Aptly Titled'. I didn't think I'd ever be able to direct again!" However he went on to direct two more films for Monogram, launching his career.

Diabolique magazine called it "a creaky comedy-drama about a doddery old reporter... whose family treats him with contempt; he goes on to  earns their respect by interrupting his son's communist rally, becoming a radio star and slut shaming his daughter" adding "these sort of worm-turns family dramas were surprisingly common in the thirties (Frank Capra made a bunch), and could be made watchable by strong actors and direction; however Successful Failures cast was poor and Lubin's handling uneasy."

References

External links 

1934 films
1934 comedy films
American comedy films
1930s English-language films
American black-and-white films
Monogram Pictures films
Films directed by Arthur Lubin
1930s American films